Acrolophus synapta is a moth of the family Acrolophidae. It is found in Central America.

References

Moths described in 1915
synapta